The Northern Ireland (Monitoring Commission etc.) Act 2003 (c 25) is an Act of the Parliament of the United Kingdom.

Section 1 came into force on 13 October 2003 and sections 2 to 11 came into force on 7 January 2004.

Section 12 - Short title, commencement and repeals
This section came into force on 18 September 2003.

The following orders were made under section 12(2):
The Northern Ireland (Monitoring Commission etc.) Act 2003 (Commencement No. 1) Order 2003 (SI 2003/2646) (C 101)
The Northern Ireland (Monitoring Commission etc.) Act 2003 (Commencement No. 2) Order 2004 (SI 2004/83) (C 3)

See also
Northern Ireland Act

References
Halsbury's Statutes,

External links
The Northern Ireland (Monitoring Commission etc.) Act 2003, as amended from the National Archives.
The Northern Ireland (Monitoring Commission etc.) Act 2003, as originally enacted from the National Archives.
Explanatory notes to the Northern Ireland (Monitoring Commission etc.) Act 2003.

United Kingdom Acts of Parliament 2003
Acts of the Parliament of the United Kingdom concerning Northern Ireland